The Venerable John Hillersdon was an Anglican priest in England during the 17th century.

Hill was born in Stoke Hammond and educated at Corpus Christi College, Oxford. He held livings at Odstock and Castle Ashby. Hillerson was Archdeacon of Buckingham from 1671 until his death 1 November 1684.

Notes 

1684 deaths
Alumni of Corpus Christi College, Oxford
Archdeacons of Buckingham
People from Buckinghamshire
17th-century English Anglican priests